Sumner Township is a township in Winneshiek County, Iowa, USA.

History
Sumner Township was established in 1862.

References

Townships in Winneshiek County, Iowa
Townships in Iowa